The Fightin' Terror is a 1920 American short silent Western film directed by and featuring Hoot Gibson.

Cast
 Hoot Gibson
 Yvette Mitchell
 Jim Corey
 Mark Fenton
 George Rand
 Harry Tenbrook

See also
 List of American films of 1920
 Hoot Gibson filmography

External links
 

1920 films
1920 short films
1920 Western (genre) films
American silent short films
American black-and-white films
Films directed by Hoot Gibson
Silent American Western (genre) films
1920s American films
1920s English-language films